Emma Fryer is a British stand-up comedian, actress and writer from Coventry, best known for playing Tania in BBC Three's Ideal, Janine in E4's PhoneShop and Gaynor in BBC Two's Home Time, which she co-wrote with Neil Edmond.

In 2005, she was a finalist in the So You Think You're Funny?, Funny Women and Leicester Mercury Comedian of the Year competitions. She has also appeared as one of the spoof presenters in Channel 4's Comedy Lab Swizzcall, played the lead character, Dawn Jones, in the online sitcom Where are the Joneses? and provided the single additional voice in the finale of Tim Key's All Bar Luke. More recently, she has appeared in BBC dramas Moving On and In The Dark.

Fryer was nominated for The Times Breakthrough Award 2010, while Home Time was nominated for Best Sitcom at both the 2010 South Bank Show Awards and The Rose D'Or.

Filmography

Film

Television

References

External links 
 
 

Year of birth missing (living people)
Alumni of Bretton Hall College
Living people
English women comedians
English television actresses
English writers
People from Coventry
English women writers